Ephraim Abileah (אפרים אביליה) is a composer known for writing one of the most widely used tunes for the Jewish Pesach prayer Ma Nishtana, in 1936 as part of his oratorio "Chag Hacherut".

Abileah was born in Russia in 1881 as Leo Nesviski (Niswizski), and was the son of a chazzan. He was one of the founders of The Society for Jewish Folk Music in St Petersburg. He was one of three representatives to present and win the case for the Society's legalization in November 1908. He and his brother Arie  left Russia and came to Israel en route through Egypt in 1922 due to their Zionist inclinations.

Ephraim married Miriam in Warsaw, Poland and the young couple moved to Vienna Austria, where Ephraim taught and composed music. Abileah's little known oratorio, "Chag Hacherut" (Festival of Freedom) tells the Passover story and was performed on stage only once in Haifa. It is from this piece that the popular tune to Mah Nishtanah originates. Abeliah also wrote the music of the wedding piece "Seven Blessings". Selections by Abilah were performed by the Jewish National Workers' Alliance choir in 1940. Abileah died in 1953.

Mah Nishtanah credit 
Prior to Abileah's composition, the Mah Nishtanah portion of the Haggadah was not sung, and instead "intoned as a talmudic, study-like chant".

Reformjudaism.com notes that as his melody was "so quickly learned and passed down by oral tradition", the composer for many years was known as the mythic 'anonymous', which was the case as recent as 1987. However, according to musicologist Dr. Eliyahu Schleifer, the melody was written by Abileah in 1936. Ethno-musicologist Dr. Naomi Cohn Zentner asserts that "the melody gained popularity not only because of the [single] performance but also due to its dissemination among songsters and singalongs".
Almost every haggadah includes the Mah Nishtanah, but two are believed to credit Ephraim Abileah as the composer.

As of 2004 the song was listed as a 'folk melody', though in this year Dani announced on Israeli radio that he had enough research to prove his grandfather was the composer, and that the family should be entitled millions of dollars in royalties.

According to My Jewish Learning, "the tune that today is nearly universal is a modern invention and speaks to [Abileah's] Zionist vision to create a new Jewish culture".

External links 

 News articles about the Abeliah family

References 

1881 births
1953 deaths
Russian Jews
Musicians from Saint Petersburg
Russian Zionists
Soviet emigrants to Mandatory Palestine